Caestocorbula is an extinct genus of saltwater clams in the family Corbulidae. The name has been created for fossils from the Eocene of Belgium.

References

External links 
 
 Caestocorbula at the World Register of Marine Species (WoRMS)
 

Corbulidae
Prehistoric mollusc genera
Bivalve genera